Sander Arends and Roman Jebavý were the defending champions but only Arends chose to defend his title, partnering Romain Arneodo. Arends lost in the semifinals to Hugo Nys and Jonny O'Mara.

Kevin Krawietz and Andreas Mies won the title after defeating Nys and O'Mara 6–1, 6–4 in the final.

Seeds

Draw

References
 Main Draw

Bauer Watertechnology Cup - Doubles
2018 Doubles